Steamtown  may refer to:

 Steamtown, Ohio, a community in the United States
 Steamtown Heritage Rail Centre, museum in Peterborough, South Australia
 Steamtown Peterborough Railway Preservation Society, former heritage railway in Peterborough, South Australia
 Steamtown, USA, former Vermont museum
 Steamtown National Historic Site, Scranton, Pennsylvania, USA
 Carnforth MPD, former museum in England also known as Steamtown
 The Marketplace at Steamtown, a mixed-use center in Scranton, Pennsylvania, United States (previously branded as the Mall at Steamtown)

See also
 West Coast Railways, English railway operator in Lancashire on the site of the old Steamtown heritage depot